Clay Smith may refer to:
Clay Smith (cricketer) (born 1971), Bermudian cricketer
Clay Smith (baseball) (1914–2002), Major League Baseball pitcher
Clay Smith (footballer) (born 1993), Australian rules footballer
Clay King Smith (1970–2001), American murderer
Green Clay Smith (1826–1895), major general during the Civil War
Clay Smith Cams, an auto shop founded in 1947 by hot rod enthusiast Clay Smith (1921–1954)
Clay Smith (music composer) (born 1953), American music composer